Scott Ray White (February 14, 1963 – May 28, 2018) was an American engineer.

Born in Kansas City, Missouri on February 14, 1963, and raised in Harrisonville, Missouri, White obtained a bachelor's degree in mechanical engineering from Missouri Institute of Science and Technology. He continued his studies at Washington University and Pennsylvania State University, where he earned a master's degree and doctorate, respectively. White began teaching at the University of Illinois Urbana-Champaign in 1990, and was eventually named Donald B. Willett Professor in Aerospace Engineering. In 2013, he was awarded a Humboldt Research Award.

He died of ocular melanoma at the age of 55 on May 28, 2018, and is survived by his wife and colleague Nancy Sottos.

Research 
Scott White Google Scholar Profile

Autonomous Materials Systems Research Group

Legacy 
Two funds were created to honor and remember Scott White. These two funds, The Scott R. White Aerospace Engineering Professorship and The Scott R. White Aerospace Engineering Visionary Scholarship are respectively dedicated to advancing the body of knowledge and research in the field of autonomous materials and supporting undergraduate research. More information on these funds can be obtained via the University of Illinois Department of Aerospace Engineering - Giving.

References

1963 births
2018 deaths
Deaths from cancer in Illinois
Deaths from uveal melanoma
American materials scientists
American mechanical engineers
Missouri University of Science and Technology alumni
Penn State College of Engineering alumni
University of Washington alumni
University of Illinois Urbana-Champaign faculty
People from Kansas City, Missouri
People from Harrisonville, Missouri
Humboldt Research Award recipients